The 1987 PGA Tour season was played from January 7 to November 1. The season consisted of 46 official money events. The season saw the debut of the Tour Championship, then sponsored by Nabisco, with the top 30 players fighting for a US$360,000 first prize and a total US$2.0 million purse. Paul Azinger and  Curtis Strange won the most tournaments, three, and there were 10 first-time winners. The tournament results, leaders, and award winners are listed below.

Schedule
The following table lists official events during the 1987 season.

Unofficial events
The following events were sanctioned by the PGA Tour, but did not carry official money, nor were wins official.

Money leaders
The money list was based on prize money won during the season, calculated in U.S. dollars.

Awards

Notes

References

External links
PGA Tour official site

PGA Tour seasons
PGA Tour